Singleton Hospital is a general hospital in Sketty Lane, Swansea, Wales. It is managed by Swansea Bay University Health Board.

History
The first stage of the hospital, which included outpatients' facilities, was completed in 1957. Work recommenced in 1963, and the second stage, which allowed the closure of the aging Swansea Hospital in St. Helen's Road, was completed in 1968.

Services

The hospital adjoins the Singleton Park Campus of Swansea University where there is a nursing school and a school of medicine. The Maggie's Cancer Care Centre for South West Wales, which was designed by the Japanese architect Kisho Kurokawa, is located in the grounds of Singleton Hospital. There is also a GP-led Minor Injuries Unit. The hospital benefits from its own Hospital Radio Station, Radio City 1386AM, which has been part of the hospital.

Public Transport
The hospital is served by a regular bus service between Morriston Hospital and Singleton Hospital.

References

External links
Singleton Hospital

Hospital buildings completed in 1957
Hospitals in Swansea
NHS hospitals in Wales
Hospitals established in 1957
1958 establishments in Wales
Teaching hospitals in Wales
Swansea Bay University Health Board